Neturei Karta (Jewish Babylonian Aramaic: ,) is a religious group of Haredi Jews, formally created in Jerusalem, then in Mandatory Palestine, in 1938, splitting off from Agudas Yisrael.  Neturei Karta opposes Zionism and calls for a "peaceful dismantling" of the State of Israel, in the belief that Jews are forbidden to have their own state until the coming of the Jewish Messiah and that the state of Israel is a rebellion against God. While the Neturei Karta describe themselves as true traditional Jews, the more secular US-based Jewish Anti-Defamation League has described them as "the farthest fringes of Judaism".

In Israel, some members also pray at affiliated beit midrash, in Jerusalem's Meah Shearim neighborhood and in Ramat Beit Shemesh Bet. Neturei Karta states that no official count of the number of members exists. The Anti-Defamation League estimates that fewer than 100 members of the community take part in anti-Israel activism. According to the Anti-Defamation League, members of Neturei Karta have a long history of "extremist statements" and support for notable anti-Zionists and Islamists.

According to the US branch of Neturei Karta:

The name Neturei Karta is a name usually given to those people who regularly pray in the Neturei Karta synagogues (Torah Ve'Yirah Jerusalem, Torah U'Tefillah London, Torah U'Tefillah NY, Beis Yehudi Upstate NY, etc.), study in or send their children to educational institutions run by Neturei Karta, or actively participate in activities, assemblies or demonstrations called by the Neturei Karta.

Origin of the name

Originally, the organization was called Chevrat HaChayim (Society of Life); however, this name was quickly supplanted in favor of the name Neturei Karta.

The name Neturei Karta literally means "Guardians of the City" in Aramaic and is derived from a narrative on page 76c of Tractate Hagigah in the Jerusalem Talmud. There, it is related that Rabbi Judah haNasi sent two rabbis on a tour of inspection:
In one town they asked to see the "guardians of the city" and the city guard was paraded before them. They said that these were not the guardians of the city but its destroyers, which prompted the citizens to ask who, then, could be considered the guardians. The rabbis answered, "The scribes and the scholars," referring them to Tehillim (Psalms) Chapter 127.

It is this role that Neturei Karta see themselves as fulfilling by defending what they believe is "the position of the Torah and authentic unadulterated Judaism."

History

Generally, members of Neturei Karta are descendants of Hungarian Jews and Lithuanian Jews who were students of the Gaon of Vilna (known as Perushim) who had settled in Jerusalem in the early nineteenth century. In the late nineteenth century, their ancestors participated in the creation of new neighborhoods outside the city walls to alleviate overcrowding in the Old City, and most are now concentrated in the neighborhood of Batei Ungarin and the larger Meah Shearim neighborhood. Members of the Malachim are also prominently represented within Neturei Karta.

At the time, they were vocal opponents to the new political ideology of Zionism that was attempting to assert Jewish sovereignty in Ottoman-controlled Palestine. They resented the new arrivals, who were predominantly non-religious, while they asserted that Jewish redemption could be brought about only by the Jewish messiah.

Neturei Karta was founded by Rabbi Amram Blau and Rabbi Aharon Katzenelbogen. Rabbi Blau was a native of Meah Shearim in Jerusalem and was active in the Agudat Israel during the British Mandate era. However, by the 1930s, the Aguda began to adopt a more compromising and accommodationist approach to the Zionist movement. This caused Rabbi Blau to split with the Aguda in 1937 and cofound Chevrat HaChayim (with Rabbi Katzenelbogen), which was soon to be known thereafter as Neturei Karta.

Other Orthodox Jewish movements, including some who oppose Zionism, have denounced the activities of the radical branch of Neturei Karta. According to The Guardian, "[e]ven among Haredi, or ultra-Orthodox circles, the Neturei Karta are regarded as a wild fringe". Neturei Karta is sometimes confused with Satmar, due to both being anti-Zionist; however, they are separate groups and have had disagreements. For example, Satmar criticized Neturei Karta for attending a 2006 holocaust revisionist conference in Iran. Neturei Karta asserts that the mass media deliberately downplays their viewpoint and makes them out to be few in number. Their protests in America are usually attended by, at most, a few dozen people. In Israel, the group's protests typically attract several hundred participants, depending on the nature of the protest and its location.

In July 2013, the Shin Bet arrested a 46-year-old member of Neturei Karta for allegedly attempting to spy on Israel for Iran. As part of a plea deal, the man was sentenced to 4 years in prison. Neturei Karta has denied that he had ever been a member of their group.

Neturei Karta's website states that its members "frequently participate[s] in public burning of the Israeli flag." On the Jewish holiday of Purim, Neturei Karta members have routinely burned Israeli flags in celebrations in cities such as London, Brooklyn and Jerusalem.<ref>Conference of Presidents: Time to cut off Neturei Karta by Ron Friedman, Times of Israel, April 4, 2012.</ref>

While many in Neturei Karta chose to simply ignore the State of Israel, this has become more difficult. Some took steps to condemn Israel and bring about its eventual dismantling until the coming of the Messiah. Chief among these was Moshe Hirsch, leader of an activist branch of Neturei Karta, who served in Yasser Arafat's cabinet as Minister for Jewish Affairs.

Beliefs

Neturei Karta stress what is said in the mussaf Shemona Esrei ("The Standing Prayer") of Yom Tov, that because of their sins, the Jewish people went into exile from the Land of Israel ("umipnei chatoeinu golinu meiartzeinu). Additionally, they maintain the view – based on the Babylonian Talmud – that any form of forceful recapture of the Land of Israel is a violation of divine will. They believe that the restoration of the Land of Israel to the Jews should happen only with the coming of the Messiah, not by self-determination.

Neturei Karta believe that the exile of the Jews can end only with the arrival of the Messiah, and that human attempts to establish Jewish sovereignty over the Land of Israel are sinful. In Neturei Karta's view, Zionism is a presumptuous affront against God. Chief among their arguments against Zionism is the Talmudic concept of the so-called Three Oaths, extracted from the discussion of certain portions of the Bible. It states that a pact consisting of three oaths was made between God, the Jewish people, and the nations of the world, when the Jews were sent into exile. One provision of the pact was that the Jews would not rebel against the non-Jewish world that gave them sanctuary; a second was that they would not immigrate en masse to the Land of Israel. In return, the gentile nations promised not to persecute the Jews. By rebelling against this pact, they argued, the Jewish people were engaging in rebellion against God.

The Neturei Karta synagogues follow the customs of the Gaon of Vilna, due to Neturei Karta's origin within the Lithuanian rather than Hasidic branch of Haredi Judaism. Neturei Karta is not a Hasidic but a Litvish group; they are often mistaken for Hasidim because their style of dress (including a shtreimel on Shabbos) is very similar to that of Hasidim. This style of dress is not unique to Neturei Karta, but is also the style of other Jerusalem Litvaks, such as Rabbi Yosef Sholom Eliashiv and his followers. Furthermore, Shomer Emunim, a Hasidic group with a similar anti-Zionist ideology, is often bundled together with Neturei Karta. Typically, the Jerusalem Neturei Karta will keep the customs of the "Old Yishuv of the city of Jerusalem even when living outside of Jerusalem or even when living abroad, as a demonstration of their love for and connection to the Holy Land.

Factionalism

In the United States, the Neturei Karta were led by Moshe Ber Beck of Monsey, New York until his death in 2021. They affiliate with the radical branch that was led by Moshe Hirsch.  Beck had courted controversy by meeting with Nation of Islam leader Minister Louis Farrakhan, who has been accused of inciting antisemitism and of describing Judaism as a "gutter religion" (although Farrakhan insists his words were misinterpreted). In addition, after meeting with the representatives from Neturei Karta, Farrakhan indicated he would be more cautious in his choice of words in the future.

Relations with the Palestinians
After two men associated with the radical branch of Neturei Karta participated in a 2004 prayer vigil for Yasser Arafat outside the Percy Military Hospital in Paris, France, where he lay on his death bed, the radical branch of Neturei Karta was widely condemned by other Orthodox Jewish organizations, including many other anti-Zionist Haredi organizations both in New York and Jerusalem. Moshe Hirsch, and what Hirsch's faction described as an "impressive contingent" of other members, attended Arafat's funeral in Ramallah.

Almost a year after the Gaza War a group of Neturei Karta members crossed into Gaza as part of the Gaza Freedom March to celebrate Jewish Shabbos to show support for Palestinians in the Hamas ruled enclave."Ultra-Orthodox Jews make rare visit to Gaza," Associated Press, Published: 01.01.10, www.ynetnews.com

Relations with Iran and President Mahmoud Ahmedinejad

In October 2005, Neturei Karta leader Rabbi Yisroel Dovid Weiss issued a statement criticising Jewish attacks on Iranian President Mahmoud Ahmadinejad. Weiss wrote that Ahmadinejad's statements were not "indicative of anti-Jewish sentiments", but rather, "a yearning for a better, more peaceful world", and "re-stating the beliefs and statements of Ayatollah Khomeini, who always emphasized and practiced the respect and protection of Jews and Judaism."

In March 2006, several members of a Neturei Karta's faction visited Iran where they met with Iranian leaders, including the Vice-President, and praised Ahmadinejad for calling for the Zionist regime occupying Jerusalem to vanish from the pages of time. The spokesmen commented that they shared Ahmadinejad's aspiration for "a disintegration of the Israeli government". In an interview with Iranian television reporters, Rabbi Weiss remarked: "The Zionists use the Holocaust issue to their benefit. We, Jews who perished in the Holocaust, do not use it to advance our interests. We stress that there are hundreds of thousands Jews around the world who identify with our opposition to the Zionist ideology and who feel that Zionism is not Jewish, but a political agenda. ... What we want is not a withdrawal to the '67 borders, but to everything included in it, so the country can go back to the Palestinians and we could live with them ..."

Tehran Holocaust Conference

In December 2006, members of Neturei Karta, including Yisroel Dovid Weiss, attended the International Conference to Review the Global Vision of the Holocaust, a controversial conference being held in Tehran, Iran that attracted a number of high-profile Holocaust deniers.

In his speech, Weiss explained that the occurrence of the Nazi Holocaust was irrefutable and spoke about the murder of his own grandparents at Auschwitz, but claimed that Zionists had "collaborated with the Nazis" and "thwarted...efforts to save...Jews" and expressed solidarity with the Iranian position of anti-Zionism. Yonah Metzger, the Chief Ashkenazi Rabbi of Israel, immediately called for those who went to Tehran to be put into 'cherem', a form of excommunication. Subsequently, the Satmar Hassidism court called on Jews "to keep away from them and condemn their actions".

On 21 December, the Edah HaChareidis rabbinical council of Jerusalem also released a statement calling on the public to distance itself from those who went to Iran. The Edah's statement followed, in major lines, the Satmar statement released a few days earlier. In January 2007, a group of protesters stood outside the radical Neturei Karta synagogue in Monsey, New York, demanding that they leave Monsey and move to Iran. Neturei Karta and their sympathisers from Monsey's Orthodox community responded with a counter-protest.

2008 Mumbai attack on Nariman House
One of the targets of the 2008 Mumbai attacks was the Nariman House, which was operated by the Jewish Chabad movement. Neturei Karta subsequently issued a leaflet criticising the Chabad movement for its relations with "the filthy, deplorable traitors – the cursed Zionists that are your friends." It added that the Chabad movement has been imbued with "false national sentiment" and criticised the organisation for allowing all Jews to stay in its centres, without differentiating "between good and evil, right and wrong, pure and impure, a Jew and a person who joins another religion, a believer and a heretic." The leaflet also criticised the invitation of Israeli state officials to the funerals of the victims, claiming that they "uttered words of heresy and blasphemy." The leaflet concluded that "the road [Chabad] have taken is the road of death and it leads to doom, assimilation and the uprooting of the Torah."Leaflet: Mumbai Chabad attack ‘God’s punishment’, Jewish Telegraphic Agency (JTA), December 15, 2008.

Sikrikim

A radical breakaway faction called Sikrikim is based in Israel, mainly in Jerusalem and Beit Shemesh. The group's engagement in acts of vandalism, "mafia-like intimidation" and violent protests caused several people, including authority figures, to push for officially labeling them as a terrorist group, along with Neturei Karta.

See also
Moshe Ber Beck
Yisroel Dovid Weiss
Jacob Israël de Haan
Yossele Schumacher affair

References

Further reading

 Yakov M. Rabkin, A Threat from Within: A Century of Jewish Opposition to Zionism. (Zed Books/Palgrave Macmillan, 2006) 
 Menashe Darash, Neturei Karta Of Meah Shearim''. Atnata 2010  (Hebrew language)

External links

 
 INDC Protests: ANSWER, MASSF and Jews United Against Zionism
 Neturei Karta vs the Zionists ABC Radio National

1938 establishments in Mandatory Palestine
Anti-Zionist organizations
Aramaic words and phrases
Haredi Judaism
Jewish anti-Zionism in Israel
Jewish anti-Zionism in Mandatory Palestine
Jewish anti-Zionism in the United States
Jewish religious movements
Jews in the State of Palestine
Haredi anti-Zionism
Jewish organizations established in 1935